Robert Francis (August 12, 1901; Upland, Pennsylvania – July 13, 1987) was an American poet who lived most of his life in Amherst, Massachusetts.

His 1953 poem, “The Pitcher”, is a classic work among coaches, athletes, baseball players —- and pitchers and artists. It demonstrates brilliantly an example of how any physical action is not just acting on the environment, but also an interactive communication with all elements of it, including the people.

Life
Robert Francis was born on August 12, 1901 in Upland, Pennsylvania. He graduated from Harvard University in 1923. He would later attend the Graduate School of Education at Harvard where he once said that he felt that he'd come home. He lived in a small house he had built for himself in 1940, which he called Fort Juniper, near Cushman Village in Amherst, Massachusetts. Francis chose to name his home "Fort Juniper" since juniper is nearly indestructible. His main poetic mentor was Robert Frost, and indeed Francis's first volume of poems, Stand Here With Me (1936), displays a poetic voice reminiscent of Frost's own in carefully crafted nature poems. However, his second book of poetry Valhalla and Other Poems was awarded with the 1939 Shelley Memorial Award. Frost once said: "poetry is the only acceptable way to say one thing and mean another."

Later work
Francis published very little during the 1940s–1950s. He decided that "for better or worse, I was a poet and there was really nothing else for me to do but go on being a poet. It was too late to change even if I had wanted to. Poetry was my most central,  intense and inwardly rewarding experience." In 1960, Francis published The Orb Weaver, which revived his reputation as a poet.

Francis uses hidden meanings in his poems, which suggest another way that Frost made an impression on Francis's poetry. In later volumes, Francis found a voice distinctively his own, relaxed in meter and characterized by puns, word-plays, slant rhymes, and repetitions of key words.  Aside from one long narrative poem in Frostian blank verse, Francis's poetry consists largely of concise lyrics, somewhat limited in thematic range but intensely crafted and deeply personal. Frost would later say that Robert Francis was America's best neglected poet. His poems often regard nature, and exhibit a distinct imagistic quality to them in representing the essence of the natural world.  Also, the poems he wrote about baseball are perennial classics in that they are memorable. His autobiography, The Trouble with Francis, was published in 1971 and details his struggle with neglect. Francis died July 13, 1987.

Awards
Francis won the Shelley Memorial Award in 1939. In 1984 the Academy of American Poets gave Francis its award for distinguished poetic achievement.

Works

Poetry
 
 
 
 
 
 
 
 
http://www.poemhunter.com/best-poems/robert-francis/thoreau-in-italy/

Autobiography

References

 The Friendship of Robert Frost and Robert Francis: High-pressure Weather and Country Air by Wally Swist (Puckerbrush Press, Constance Hunting, Editor, Orono, ME: Puckerbrush Review, xxi, ii, Winter/Spring 2003).
 The Friendship of Two New England Poets: Robert Frost and Robert Francis, A Lecture Presented at the Robert Frost Farm in Derry, New Hampshire, by Wally Swist Lewiston, NY: The Edwin Mellen Press, 2009.

External links
 "A Poet's Voice Rises from the Archives", All Things Considered, April 1, 2007, NPR
 Robert Francis Papers at Syracuse University
 Robert Francis Papers at University of Massachusetts, Amherst
 Robert Francis Collection in Special Collections, Jones Library, Amherst, Massachusetts
 Poetry reading by Robert Francis, May 20, 1971 (audio)
 "April - Robert Francis: Poetry and Song" with Henry Lyman and Judy Polan. Poetry and retrospective of Robert Francis. Videotaped at Jones Library, Amherst, MA. 1988.

1901 births
1987 deaths
People from Delaware County, Pennsylvania
Poets from Pennsylvania
Writers from Amherst, Massachusetts
Poets from Massachusetts
20th-century American poets
Harvard Graduate School of Education alumni